Maurice Brasset (April 12, 1884 in Havre-Aubert, Quebec, Canada – April 5, 1971) was a Canadian politician and lawyer. He was elected to the House of Commons of Canada in the 1930 election as a Member of the Liberal Party to represent the riding of Gaspé. He was re-elected in 1935 and defeated in 1940.

External links
 

1884 births
1971 deaths
Liberal Party of Canada MPs
Members of the House of Commons of Canada from Quebec
French Quebecers
Place of death missing